Shipwrecked is the past tense of shipwreck.

Shipwrecked may also refer to:

Shipwrecked (TV series), a UK reality television show (2000–2012)
Shipwrecked (1926 film), a 1926 film
Shipwrecked (1939 film), a 1939 film
Shipwrecked (1990 film), a 1990 film
Shipwrecked (album), a 2004 album by Sultans
Shipwrecked, a 1977 album by Gonzalez
"Shipwrecked" (Genesis song), 1997 album
"Shipwrecked", a song by the Gothic Archies
"Shipwrecked" (I Shouldn't be Alive episode), an episode from the Discovery Channel program I Shouldn't Be Alive
The Shipwrecked, a 1994 Chilean film
"Shipwrecked", The fourth downloadable content expansion of the video game Don't Starve

See also
 
 
 Shipwreck (disambiguation)